Raewyn Mary Dalziel  is a New Zealand historian specialising in New Zealand social history.

Biography

Career
Dalziel was Vice Chancellor (Academic) of the University of Auckland from 1999 to 2009. She is an emeritus professor of history at the university.

In 2013, she was appointed chair of Museum of New Zealand Te Papa Tongarewa's Research Advisory Panel.

In 2014, Dalziel established the Ellen Castle Undergraduate Scholarship at the University of Auckland, in memory of her mother.

Honours and awards
In the 2004 Queen's Birthday Honours, Dalziel was appointed an Officer of the New Zealand Order of Merit, for services to education.

Personal life 
In 1976, Dalziel married fellow historian Keith Sinclair.

Selected publications

Books 

Dalziel, R. (1968). Sir Julius Vogel. Wellington: Reed.
Dalziel, R. (1975). The origins of New Zealand diplomacy: The Agent-General in London, 1870–1905. Wellington: Price Milburn for Victoria University Press.
Sinclair, K., & Dalziel, R. (2000). A history of New Zealand. Auckland. Penguin.

Articles 

 Dalziel, R. (1 January 1977). The colonial helpmeet: Women's role and the vote in nineteenth-century New Zealand. New Zealand Journal of History, 112–122.
Dalziel, R. (1 January 1994). Review article on publications marking the centenary of women's suffrage in New Zealand. Australian Feminist Studies, 19, 191–197.
Dalziel, R. (18 December 2014). A Blighted Fame: George S. Evans 1802–1868, A Life. The Journal of New Zealand Studies, 18.
Dalziel, R. (1 January 2017). The Privileged Crime: Policing and Prosecuting Bigamy in Nineteenth-Century New Zealand. New Zealand Journal of History, 51, 2, 1–25.
Dalziel, R. (1986). Education was the key. In Clark, Margaret (ed). Beyond Expectations: fourteen New Zealand women write about their lives. Allen & Unwin. p. 125–142.

References

Living people
Academic staff of the University of Auckland
New Zealand women historians
Officers of the New Zealand Order of Merit
People associated with the Museum of New Zealand Te Papa Tongarewa
Year of birth missing (living people)
Sinclair family
20th-century New Zealand historians